The 1975–76 Alpha Ethniki was the 40th season of the highest football league of Greece. The season began on 5 October 1975 and ended on 23 May 1976. PAOK won their first Greek title in history.

The point system was: Win: 2 points - Draw: 1 point.

League table

Results

Top scorers

External links
Greek Wikipedia
Official Greek FA Site
Greek SuperLeague official Site
SuperLeague Statistics

Alpha Ethniki seasons
Greece
1975–76 in Greek football leagues